Araneus pegnia is a species of orb weaver in the spider family Araneidae. It is found in a range from the United States to Ecuador and Jamaica.

References

External links

 

Araneus
Articles created by Qbugbot
Spiders described in 1841